Gushi is a county of 1,023,857 people directly governed by Henan, People's Republic of China. It is administered by the prefecture-level city of Xinyang.

With a total area of 2942.97 square kilometers and a registered population of 1781500 at the end of 2018, it is the county with the largest registered population in Henan.

Administration
Gushi has 3 subdistricts, 17 towns and 13 townships.

History

Gushi County was the capital of one of the two States of Liao during the Spring and Autumn period of Chinese history (771–436 BCE).

Climate

Demographic 

Gushi is the most-populous county in the Henan Province, with an estimated record high of 1,734,100 citizens with registration as of 2013, according to the 2013 annual statistics report. As of the sixth national census in 2010, there are 1,023,857 residents living inside the county, showing that nearly half of the population moved out of the county without changing their residents registration status.

In 2010, the county had a population density of 348 people per square kilometer (901/mi²).

Transportation
The Nanjing–Xi'an Railway along as G40 Shanghai–Xi'an Expressway passing through the southern side of Gushi from the east to the west, connect the county with Xinyang and Hefei. A branch line, S39 Huaibin-Gushi Expressway links the county seat to the national expressway network from north to south. One major railway station located in the Town of Duanji in the southern part of the county and three intersections of the expressways have connections with local roads in the central and southern area. The national highway network, connecting other counties in this region, consists of three different routes: Line 220, Line 312 and Line 328. In the north border to Anhui, Huai River flowing from the west to the east serves as a class III Waterway.

Notable people
 Chen Yuanguang, Sacred Prince, Developer of Zhangzhou
 Wang Shenzhi, the founder of the Min Kingdom on the southeast coast of China

References

External links

Gushi Information Network
Gushi County government 
A Survey of Gushi – China Council for the Promotion of International Trade
Rural China's office politics – November 2007 BBC News article on Gushi County

County-level divisions of Henan
Xinyang